Adolfo Celli (31 December 1896 – 23 February 1968) was an Argentine footballer. He played in 14 matches for the Argentina national football team from 1919 to 1924. He was also part of Argentina's squad for the 1921 South American Championship.

References

External links
 

1896 births
1968 deaths
Argentine footballers
Argentina international footballers
Place of birth missing
Association football defenders
Newell's Old Boys footballers
Club Atlético Colón footballers
Argentine football managers
Newell's Old Boys managers
San Lorenzo de Almagro managers